Layang-Layang may refer to:

 Layang-Layang Airport, an airport in the Spartly islands administered by Malaysia
 Layang-Layang, Johor, a town in Johor, Malaysia
 Layang-Layang railway station, a railway station in Johor, Malaysia
 Layang-Layang (state constituency), a state constituency in Johor, Malaysia
 Swallow Reef, a disputed island in South China Sea